Maria Jackson is a fictional character played by Yasmin Paige in the British children's science fiction television programme The Sarah Jane Adventures, a spin-off from the long-running series Doctor Who. She is a 13-year-old girl who discovers that her new neighbour, Sarah Jane Smith, is aware of the existence of extraterrestrial life and is a former space and time traveller. Maria first appears in the 2007 New Year's special and series première, "Invasion of the Bane". Due to the actress's scholastic commitments, the character was written out as a regular in the series 2 opener The Last Sontaran, but continued to be referred to in dialogue and seen in archival footage.

Character history
In "Invasion of the Bane", Maria moves in with her father Alan after the divorce from her mum Chrissie. Her parents seem to be on good terms, and her mother visits often. Sarah Jane lived opposite her and would often ignore her. However, Maria later helps Sarah Jane close down the Bubble Shock! factory which was secretly a facility of aliens known as the Bane who were aiming to destroy mankind and take over the Earth. She also helped a young boy whom the Bane had created escape from the Bane, who later became known as Luke Smith. Maria also quickly made friends with a neighbor named Kelsey Hooper, who was involved with the Bane attack. It is unknown whether Maria remained friends with Kelsey. Either way, Kelsey never made another appearance in the series.

In Revenge of the Slitheen, Maria started her new school with Luke and there, she met Clyde Langer. Little did they know their teachers are Slitheen; when they find out, the children learn that the Slitheen want to crash the moon into the earth and turn off the Sun. They managed to stop the Slitheen but some of them escaped. Together, the group would later face the Gorgons (Eye of the Gorgon) and the alien Uvodni (Warriors of Kudlak) in an off-Earth spaceship.

In the Series One finale The Lost Boy, Luke is kidnapped under the pretence that he is not in fact an artificially created human, but rather a real boy given extraordinary abilities and a loss of memories. Sarah Jane is branded a child abductor, and Maria and Clyde are the only ones who believe she is innocent; Luke's "real" parents turn out to be Slitheen aliens whose evidence confirming Luke is their son was provided by Mr Smith, Sarah Jane's computer. Maria assists her father, K-9 and Sarah Jane in corrupting Mr Smith's memory banks with an illegally obtained super-computer virus. Luke, captured by Mr Smith in an attempt to use his latent telekinetic ability to destroy the planet, is freed, and Sarah Jane reprograms Mr Smith with a new benevolent mission statement.

Maria and her father are travelling in Cornwall during the events of the Doctor Who episodes "The Stolen Earth"/"Journey's End", as stated by Luke.

In the series 2 premiere, The Last Sontaran, Maria leaves for America, where her father has attained a new job in Washington, D.C. In The Day of the Clown, Maria is shown to still keep in contact with Luke and Sarah Jane via e-mail. In The Mark of the Berserker, Maria and her father are contacted by Luke and Rani to investigate the history of an alien pendant by hacking into the UNIT database. They trace the live movements of Paul and Clyde and transmit them to Carla Langer's satnav device.

In the second serial of the third series, The Mad Woman in the Attic, it is mentioned that Maria is helping the government hide aliens. She is referred to by Clyde as the "new Sarah Jane". As she is in Washington, D.C., it is unclear whether Clyde is referring to the British government, the U.S. government or UNIT. In the first serial of the fourth series, The Nightmare Man, Luke carries on an instant message conversation with Maria. She is shown in archival footage two serials later in Death of the Doctor as well as the final conclusion in The Man Who Never Was.

Alternate timelines
In Whatever Happened to Sarah Jane?, Maria is immune to a change in the past made by the Trickster which erases Sarah Jane from history. Desperate to find answers, Maria draws the attention of a Graske who she uses to take her back in time to the moment in history changed by the Trickster, where Sarah Jane fell to her death in place of friend Andrea Yates. Returning to the present, she is erased from history by the Trickster in a similar fashion and meets Sarah Jane in limbo, where the Trickster had stored her to acquire information on new targets. However, back on Earth, Maria's father, noticing Maria's disappearance and believing her stories of the mysterious "Sarah Jane" is able to convince Andrea Yates, who has lived a long life in place of Sarah Jane, to rescind her contract with the Trickster and return the timeline to normal.

Parallel world
Maria is mentioned for the first time in Doctor Who in the episode "Turn Left", which sees the "Time Beetle" create a reality where Donna Noble never met the Doctor, resulting in his death. In this new reality where the Doctor is dead, Maria is subsequently killed along with Sarah Jane, Luke, Clyde and Martha Jones attempting to stop the events of the episode "Smith and Jones".

External links

 BBC Character page

References

Television characters introduced in 2007
The Sarah Jane Adventures characters
Female characters in television
Fictional people from London
Fictional characters from Washington, D.C.
Teenage characters in television